Janaka Wannakuwatta (born 9 July 1980) is a Sri Lankan former cricketer. He played in 65 first-class and 59 List A matches between 1999/00 and 2008/09. He made his Twenty20 debut on 17 August 2004, for Sebastianites Cricket and Athletic Club in the 2004 SLC Twenty20 Tournament.

References

External links
 

1980 births
Living people
Sri Lankan cricketers
Badureliya Sports Club cricketers
Lankan Cricket Club cricketers
Moors Sports Club cricketers
Sebastianites Cricket and Athletic Club cricketers
Place of birth missing (living people)